Richard Owen Kingrea (born July 18, 1949 in Pearisburg, Virginia) is a former American football linebacker who played eight seasons in the National Football League for the Cleveland Browns, Buffalo Bills, and the New Orleans Saints.  He played college football at Tulane University. After football, Kingrea became an attorney and served as City Councilman in Fairhope, Alabama.

References

Cleveland Browns players
Buffalo Bills players
New Orleans Saints players
Tulane Green Wave football players
1949 births
Living people
American football linebackers
People from Pearisburg, Virginia
People from Fairhope, Alabama